WOW Hits 2015 is a two–disc compilation album featuring of the biggest songs on Christian radio in 2013 and 2014. The album features 33 songs in the standard, and 39 in the deluxe. It was released on September 30, 2014. As of January 2015 it has sold 155,000 copies.

Track listing

Chart performance

Release history

References

2014 compilation albums
2015